Bronisław Witkowski (27 August 1899 in Lviv – 15 October 1971 in Krynica-Zdrój) was a Polish luger who competed during the 1930s. He won the bronze medal in the men's singles event at the 1935 European luge championships in Krynica, Poland.

References
 List of European luge champions 

Polish male lugers
Place of birth missing
1899 births
1971 deaths
Sportspeople from Lviv
People from Krynica-Zdrój